Adetaptera thomasi is a species of beetle in the family Cerambycidae. It was described by Linsley and Chemsak in 1984.

References

Apomecynini
Beetles described in 1984